Brandán is a surname. Notable people with the name include:

Braian Brandán (born 1998), Argentine footballer
Fernando Brandán (footballer, born 1980), Argentine footballer
Fernando Brandán (footballer, born 1990), Argentine footballer
Pablo Brandán (born 1983), Argentine footballer and manager

See also
Brandan, given name and surname